Ali Matthews is a Canadian Contemporary Christian musician and songwriter from Stratford, Ontario, Canada.

Musical career

Ali Matthews began her career as a performing artist and songwriter while still in her teens.  Her debut album Patchwork was released in 2000. Ali performs with guitarist and co-producer Rick Francis, and sometimes with a seven-piece band named The Good China. She is a graduate of The University of Western Ontario and is married.

Ali has won fifteen Gospel Music Association Canada Covenant Awards, was nominated for a further thirteen, and has been nominated for seven Shai Awards.

Discography
Albums

Notable appearances
 Vocals on "Under African Skies", "Leaving", and "Speak to Me", on Jacob Moon's album Landing 2: the 10th Anniversary Concert (Moonbeam Music, 2012)

Songs on compilations
 Sea to Sea: I See The Cross, "Lord of the Starfields" (CMC, 2005)
 27th Annual Covenant Hits, "On Angels' Wings" (CMC, 2006)
 Sea to Sea: The Voice of Creation, "You Knew My Name" (CMC, 2007)
 28th Annual Covenant Hits, "Sweeter Than Wine" (CMC, 2007)
 GMA Canada presents 30th Anniversary Collection, "Hunger Mountain" (CMC, 2008)
 Sea to Sea: Christmas, "The Cry Of Bethlehem" (Lakeside, 2009)

Awards and recognition 
GMA Canada Covenant Awards

 2004 Inspirational Album of the Year: Where You Remain
 2004 Country/Bluegrass/Southern Gospel Song Of The Year: "Hunger Mountain"
 2005 Seasonal Song Of The Year: "On Angels' Wings"
 2006 Folk/Roots Album Of The Year: Window Of Light
 2006 Folk/Roots Song of the Year: "Poised For A Fall"
 2006 Country/Bluegrass Song Of The Year: "Sweeter Than Wine"
 2006 Seasonal Song Of The Year: "Brand New Miracle" (songwriters Ali Matthews and Rick Francis)
 2007 four nominations: Female Vocalist Of The Year, Song Of The Year: "Window Of Light" (Ali Matthews and Rick Francis), Folk/Roots Song Of The Year: "Which Way Is Home (The Prayer Of The Prodigal)", and Jazz/Blues Song Of The Year: "Window Of Light" (Ali Matthews and Rick Francis)
 2008 Instrumental Song Of The Year: "The Cry Of Bethlehem"
 2008 Seasonal Song Of The Year: "The Cry Of Bethlehem"
 2009 Seasonal Album Of The Year: Looking For Christmas
 2011 Four awards, including: Female Vocalist Of The Year, Album Of The Year: Carry Me Home, Folk/Roots Song Of The Year: "God Only Knows" and CD/DVD Artwork Design Of The Year: Carry Me Home
 2012: Female Vocalist Of The Year

International Songwriting Competition (ISC)
 2006 third place, Lyrics Only: "Poised For A Fall"

Just Plain Folks Music Awards
 2006 Contemporary Christian Album: Where You Remain

Shai Awards (formerly The Vibe Awards)
 2007 nominee, Artist of the Year

References

External links 
 Ali Matthews' Official home page. Retrieved 2009-03-11.
 
 

Year of birth missing (living people)
Living people
Place of birth missing (living people)
University of Western Ontario alumni
Canadian folk musicians
Canadian women singers
Canadian singer-songwriters
Canadian performers of Christian music
Musicians from Ontario